Heliopetes macaira, the Turk's-cap white-skipper , is a butterfly of the family Hesperiidae. It is found from southern Texas in North America, south through Central America to Paraguay.

The wingspan is 32–35 mm. There are several generations with adults on wing from April to November in southern Texas.

The larvae feed on Malvaviscus drummondii. Adults feed on flower nectar.

Subspecies
Heliopetes macaira macaira (Arizona, Mexico, Guatemala, Panama, Venezuela)
Heliopetes macaira orbigera (Brazil, Bolivia)

External links
Butterflies and Moths of North America

Pyrgini
Hesperiidae of South America